The Floating Dutchman is a 1950 crime novel by the British writer Nicolas Bentley.

Film adaptation
In 1952 it was made into film of the same title directed by Vernon Sewell and starring Dermot Walsh, Sydney Tafler and Mary Germaine.

References

Bibliography
 Goble, Alan. The Complete Index to Literary Sources in Film. Walter de Gruyter, 1999.
 Reilly, John M. Twentieth Century Crime & Mystery Writers. Springer, 2015.

1950 British novels
British crime novels
British thriller novels
British mystery novels
British novels adapted into films
Michael Joseph books
Novels set in London